Darry Ring (colloquially known as DR and DR Ring, Chinese: DR钻戒）is an online jewelry retailer specializing in diamond engagement rings and wedding rings. It also offers necklaces, bracelets, earrings, personalized items as well as jewelry repair services. It is founded in 2010 and headquartered in Shenzhen, China. The company currently has more than 420 offline stores in Hong Kong, Beijing, Shanghai, Guangzhou, Shenzhen and with its international flagship store located in Carrousel du Louvre, Paris.

Darry Ring was born with the rule that each man can only buy one diamond ring per lifetime with his ID card. Its unique format of purchasing a diamond ring in real name by tying it to an ID card is the first of its kind in the world and has attracted a lot of attention in China. Through this strategy, it has encouraged what it calls “lifetime commitment” among Chinese consumers.

History 
In 2010, Guotao Zhang and his wife, Yiwen Lu, founded Shenzhen Darry Jewelry Co. The word "Darry" means Diamond + Marry.

In July 2019, Shenzhen Darry Jewelry Corporation Limited changed its name to DR Corporation Limited.

On December 15, 2021, DR Corporation Limited (301177.SZ), was officially listed on the Shenzhen Stock Exchange.

Service 
The company use the real-name model of customization with ID card, which enables users to purchase only one diamond ring in their lifetime by binding their ID card and signing a true love agreement.

References

External links 

Jewelry (group)
Companies established in 2010
Online jewellery retailers
Companies formerly listed on stock exchanges